British Rail Engineering Limited (BREL) was the railway systems engineering subsidiary of British Rail. Established in 1970, the maintenance arm was split as British Rail Maintenance Limited in 1987, and the design and building of trains was privatised in 1989, purchased by the Swiss-Swedish conglomerate Asea Brown Boveri (40%), Trafalgar House (40%), and a management-employee buy-out (20%). After ABB became the sole shareholder in September 1992, it was subsumed into ABB Transportation.

History

BREL was established by the British Railways Board on 1 January 1970 to take over the management of its 14 rolling stock maintenance centres, including Ashford, Crewe, Derby Litchurch Lane, Derby Locomotive, Doncaster, Eastleigh, Glasgow, Horwich, Shildon, Swindon, Wolverton, and York. Ashford Works closed in 1981, Shildon in 1984, and Swindon in 1986. In 1987, Doncaster, Eastleigh, Glasgow, and Wolverton were transferred to BR Maintenance.

Not all British Rail rolling stock was built in-house: Brush Traction, Metro-Cammell, and Metropolitan-Vickers amongst others manufactured rolling stock, although in general, it was built to BREL specifications. Latterly, BREL often acted as a subcontractor to a main contractor such as GEC, which supplied traction equipment. These contracts required BREL to build the frames, body shells, and bogies and install the traction and ancillary equipment of the primary contractor. Much of the electric locomotive construction programme of the 1980s, such as Classes 89, 90, and 91, was carried out in this way.

As part of the privatisation of British Rail, BREL was sold in a management buyout, with management and employees owning 20% and Asea Brown Boveri and Trafalgar House 40% each. In 1991 Derby Locomotive Works closed. In March 1992, ABB bought out the other shareholders with BREL subsumed into ABB Transportation in September 1992.

Products

Diesels

Electrics

Multiple units

BREL also produced some railbuses.

Coaches

Main products
The vast majority of BREL's output was rolling stock for British Rail, including Mark 2 and Mark 3 carriages, the latter for locomotive haulage and InterCity 125 diesel High-Speed Trains. BREL built the NIR 80 Class diesel-electric multiple units for Northern Ireland Railways. Other Mark 3 derived vehicles included Class 150 diesel multiple units in the 1980s and numerous electric multiple units such as Classes 313 and 317.

BREL had success in the export market, notably with Mark 2 and Mark 3 carriages for Iarnród Éireann and the Taiwan Railway EMU100 series. Rolling stock was also manufactured for Ghana, Kenya, Malaysia, and Tanzania.

Other products

BREL built prototypes such as the Class 210 DEMU and the experimental high-speed Advanced Passenger Train (APT) tilting train during the 1970s and early 1980s. The Class 210 were externally very similar to the first batch of Class 317 EMUs, but half of the forward carriage was taken up by the engine room, where an above-floor diesel engine drove a generator to power traction motors on the axles.

References

External links
 

1970 establishments in the United Kingdom
1992 disestablishments in the United Kingdom
ABB
British Rail research and development
British Rail subsidiaries and divisions
Companies based in Derby
Locomotive manufacturers of the United Kingdom
Railway companies disestablished in 1992
Railway companies established in 1970
Rolling stock manufacturers of the United Kingdom
Science and technology in Derbyshire